Ukraine was in 96th place out of 180 countries listed in the 2020 World Press Freedom Index, having returned to top 100 of this list for the first time since 2009, but dropped down one spot to 97th place in 2021, being characterized as being in a "difficult situation".

Press freedom scores had significantly improved since the Orange Revolution of 2004. However, in 2010 and again in 2011 Freedom House perceived "negative trends in Ukraine" with government-critical opposition media outlets being closed.

According to the Freedom House, The Ukrainian legal framework on media freedom used to be "among the most progressive in eastern Europe", although implementation has been uneven.
The Constitution of Ukraine and a 1991 law provide for freedom of speech.

Many Ukrainian journalists found themselves internally displaced due to the Russian annexation of Crimea and the war in Donbas, including Donetsk-based investigative journalist Oleksiy Matsuka, Luhansk blogger Serhiy Ivanov and Donetsk Ostrov independent website editor Serhiy Harmash. The entire staff of Ostrov left the occupied Donbas areas and relocated to Kyiv.

History

The Freedom in the World report by Freedom House rated Ukraine "partly free" from 1992 until 2003, when it was rated "not free". After 2005, it was rated "partly free" again. According to Freedom House internet in Ukraine is "Free" and the press is "Partly Free".

Ukraine's ranking in Reporters Without Borderss' Press Freedom Index has long been around the 90th spot (89 in 2009, 87 in 2008), while it occupied the 112th spot in 2002 and even the 132nd spot in 2004. In 2010 it fell to the 131st place; according to Reporters Without Borders this was the result of "the slow and steady deterioration in press freedom since Viktor Yanukovych's election as president in February". In 2013 Ukraine occupied the 126th spot (dropping 10 places compared with 2012); (according to Reporters Without Borders) "the worst record for the media since the Orange Revolution in 2004". In the 2017 World Press Freedom Index Ukraine was placed 102nd.

During an opinion poll by Research & Branding Group in October 2009 49.2% of the respondents stated that Ukraine's level of freedom of speech was sufficient, and 19.6% said the opposite. Another 24.2% said that there was too much of freedom of speech in Ukraine. According to the data, 62% of respondents in western Ukraine considered the level of freedom of speech sufficient, and in the central and southeastern regions the figures were 44% and 47%, respectively.

In a late 2010 poll also conducted by the Research & Branding Group 56% of all Ukrainians trusted the media and 38.5% didn't.

Kuchma presidencies (1994–2004) 

After the (only) term of office of the first Ukrainian President Leonid Kravchuk ended in 1994, the freedom of the press worsened. During the presidency of Leonid Kuchma (1994–2004) several news-outlets critical to him were forcefully closed. In 1999 the Committee to Protect Journalists placed Kuchma on the list of worst enemies of the press. In that year the Ukrainian Government partially limited freedom of the press through tax inspections (Mykola Azarov, who later became Prime Minister of Ukraine, headed the tax authority during Kuchma's presidency), libel cases, subsidization, and intimidation of journalists; this caused many journalists to practice self-censorship. In 2003 and 2004 authorities interfered with the media by issuing written and oral instructions about what events to cover. Toward the very end of the 2004 Ukrainian presidential election campaign in November 2004, many media outlets began to ignore government direction and covered events in a more objective, professional manner.

Orange revolution and Yushchenko presidency (2004–2010) 
Since the Orange Revolution (of 2004) Ukrainian media have become more pluralistic and independent. For instance, attempts by authorities to limit freedom of the press through tax inspections have ceased. Since then the Ukrainian press is considered to be among the freest of all post-Soviet states (only the Baltic states are considered "free").

After the 2005 Orange Revolution, Ukrainian television became more free. In February 2009 the National Council for Television and Radio Broadcasting claimed that "political pressure on mass media increased in recent times through amending laws and other normative acts to strengthen influence on mass media and regulatory bodies in this sphere".

In 2007, in Ukraine's provinces numerous, anonymous attacks and threats persisted against journalists, who investigated or exposed corruption or other government misdeeds. The US-based Committee to Protect Journalists concluded in 2007 that these attacks, and police reluctance in some cases to pursue the perpetrators, were "helping to foster an atmosphere of impunity against independent journalists."

In Ukraine's provinces numerous, anonymous attacks and threats persisted against journalists, who investigated or exposed corruption or other government misdeeds. The US-based Committee to Protect Journalists concluded in 2007 that these attacks, and police reluctance in some cases to pursue the perpetrators, were "helping to foster an atmosphere of impunity against independent journalists." Media watchdogs have stated attacks and pressure on journalists have increased since the February 2010 election of Viktor Yanukovych as President.

In December 2009, and during the 2010 Ukrainian presidential election, campaign incumbent Prime Minister of Ukraine and presidential candidate Yulia Tymoshenko complained Ukrainian TV channels are manipulating the consciousness of citizens in favor of financial and oligarchic groups. As of January 2009, Ukrainian Prime Minister, Yulia Tymoshenko refused to appear in Inter TV-programmes "until journalists, management and owners of the TV channel stop destroying the freedom of speech and until they remember the essence of their profession - honesty, objectiveness, and unbiased stand".

Yanukovych presidency (2010-2013)
Since Viktor Yanukovych was elected President of Ukraine in February 2010 Ukrainian journalists and international journalistic watchdogs (including the European Federation of Journalists and Reporters Without Borders) have complained about a deterioration of press freedom in Ukraine. Yanukovych responded (in May 2010) that he "deeply values press freedom" and that "free, independent media that must ensure society's unimpeded access to information". Anonymous journalists stated early May 2010 that they were voluntarily tailoring their coverage so as not to offend the Yanukovych administration and the Azarov Government. The Azarov Government denies censoring the media, so did the Presidential Administration and President Yanukovych himself. Presidential Administration Deputy Head Hanna Herman stated on 13 May 2010 that the opposition benefited from discussions about the freedom of the press in Ukraine and also suggested that the recent reaction of foreign journalists organizations had been provoked by the opposition. On 12 May 2010, the parliamentary committee for freedom of speech and information called on the General Prosecutor's Office to immediately investigate complaints by journalists of pressure on journalists and censorship. Also in May 2010 the Stop Censorship movement was founded by more than 500 journalist.

A law on strengthening the protection of the ownership of mass media offices, publishing houses, bookshops and distributors, as well as creative unions was passed by the Ukrainian Parliament on 20 May 2010.

Since the February 2010 election of Viktor Yanukovych as President Media watchdogs have stated attacks and pressure on journalists have increased. The International Press Institute addressed an open letter to President Yanukovych on 10 August 2010 urging him to address what the organisation saw as a disturbing deterioration in press freedom over the previous six months in Ukraine. PACE rapporteur Renate Wohlwend noticed on 6 October 2010 that "Some progress had been made in recent years but there had also been some retrograde steps". In January 2011 Freedom House stated it had perceived "negative trends in Ukraine" during 2010; these included: curbs on press freedom, the intimidation of civil society, and greater government influence on the judiciary.

According to the US Department of State in 2009 there were no attempts by central authorities to direct media content, but there were reports of intimidation of journalists by national and local officials. Media at times demonstrated a tendency toward self‑censorship on matters that the government deemed sensitive. Stories in the electronic and printed media (veiled advertisements and positive coverage presented as news) and participation in a television talk show can be bought. Media watchdog groups have express concern over the extremely high monetary damages that were demanded in court cases concerning libel.

In 2013 there were concerns over the corrupting influence of certain political figures, connected to the government of Viktor Yanukovych on Ukrainian media.

Euromaidan revolution and Poroshenko presidency (2014) 

A May 2014 report from the OSCE found approximately 300 instances of perceived violent attacks on the media in Ukraine since November 2013. The Ukrainian NGO Institute of Mass Information recorded at least 995 violations of free speech in 2014 - the double than in 2013 (496) and triple than in 2012 (324). Most attacks on journalists happened during the euromaidan period in Kyiv (82 in January, 70 in February 2014). 78 journalists were abducted and illegally detained by various groups in 2014 - a new category of professional risk; 20 such cases happened in Donetsk in April 2014. 
In 2014 restrictions to press freedom in Ukraine included police impeding access to public buildings, physical attacks on press rooms, and cyberattacks (e.g. against the Glavnoe, Gordon and UNIAN websites); in July 2014 a firebomb was thrown at the TV channel 112 Ukraine.

Political interference in the media sector greatly diminished after the flight of Yanukovych from Ukraine, with media outlets almost immediately starting to openly discuss the events of the previous months, including the moments of violence, which had previously been censored or self-censored through pressures on owners and managers. The 2014 Ukrainian parliamentary election was covered with a wide variety of political orientations in the media. Minor cases of pressures or censorship attempts were reported in 2014 too.  In Kirovohrad in December 2014 a regional politician ordered a subordinate to review the Zorya newspaper before its publication.

Censorship issues were debated in 2015 concerning aggressive propaganda from Russian state-owned news outlets to support the Russian annexation of Crimea, encourage separatism in Donbas and discredit the Kyiv government. Creating some concern among Western human rights monitors was that under the impact of war and perceived extreme social polarization the Ukrainian government has been accused of cracking down on pro-separatist points of view. For example, Ukraine also shut down most Russia-based television stations on the grounds that they purvey "propaganda," and barred a growing list of Russian journalists from entering the country.

The Ministry of Information Policy was established on 2 December 2014. The ministry oversees information policy in Ukraine. According to the first Minister of Information, Yuriy Stets, one of the goals of its formation was to counteract "Russian information aggression" amidst pro-Russian unrest across Ukraine, and the ongoing war in the Donbas region. Ukrainian president Petro Poroshenko said that the main function of the ministry is to stop "the spreading of biased information about Ukraine".

On 16 May 2017 president Poroshenko signed a decree banning various Russian internet service providers and news sources, among others, VKontakte, Odnoklassniki, Yandex, Rossiya Segodnya, RBC, VGTRK, but also a number of independent stations such as the RBC, claiming this was done for "security reasons". Tanya Cooper from Human Rights Watch called the decree: "a cynical, politically expedient attack on the right to information affecting millions of Ukrainians, and their personal and professional lives". Reporters Without Borders (RSF) also condemned the ban imposed on Russian social networks.

Since November 2015 Ukrainian authorities, state agencies and local government authorities are forbidden to act as founders (or cofounders) of printed media outlets.

Freedom House reported the status of press freedom in Ukraine in 2015 as improving from Not Free to Partly Free. It justified the change as follows:
due to profound changes in the media environment after the fall of President Viktor Yanukovych's government in February, despite a rise in attacks on journalists during the Euromaidan protests of early 2014 and the subsequent conflict in eastern Ukraine. The level of government hostility and legal pressure faced by journalists decreased, as did political pressure on state-owned outlets. The media also benefited from improvements to the law on access to information and the increased independence of the broadcasting regulator.
In 2015 the main concerns about media freedom in Ukraine concern the handling of pro-Russian propaganda, the concentration of media ownership, and the high risks of violence against journalists, especially in the conflict areas in the east. In September 2015 Freedom House classified the Internet in Ukraine as "partly free" and the press as "partly free". Ukraine was in 102nd place out of 180 countries listed in the 2017 World Press Freedom Index. In 2017 organizations like Reporters Without Borders, Human Rights Watch and Committee to Protect Journalists condemned then Poroshenko's government recent bans on media.

Press freedom scores as perceived by Freedom House 

The following table shows press freedom scores calculated each year by a foreign non-governmental organisation called Freedom House.  The year is the year of issue, and data relate to the previous year.
Score 0–30 = press were free.
Score 31–60 = press were partly free.
Score 61–100 = press were not free.

Attacks and threats against journalists 
Ukraine was one of the most dangerous places for journalists in the world during the euromaidan demonstrations and the war in Donbas. A May 2014 report from the OSCE found approximately 300 instances of perceived violent attacks on the media in Ukraine since November 2013. 78 journalists were abducted and illegally detained by various groups in 2014 - a new category of professional risk; 20 such cases happened in Donetsk in April 2014. In July 2014 a firebomb was thrown at the TV channel 112 Ukraine. In September 2016 Inter TV channel - often accused of being pro-Russia - was put to fire during a protest.

Amnesty International has appealed for the release of Ukrainian journalist Ruslan Kotsaba and declared him a prisoner of conscience.

The website Myrotvorets has published personal information about journalists.

Timeline of reporters killed in Ukraine

Under former President Leonid Kuchma opposition papers were closed and several journalists died in mysterious circumstances.

Missing reporters
 Sergei Dolgov, a newspaper editor from Mariupol, went missing in June 2014 during the War in Donbas and is presumed dead by some mostly pro-Russian sources.

Banned journalists, media, websites 
The Ukrainian government and President Petro Poroshenko have banned journalists, media and websites. The new sanctions in May 2017 targeted 1,228 people and 468 companies. The decision was condemned by Reporters Without Borders, Human Rights Watch and Committee to Protect Journalists. The most well known included:

Literature
The Government of Ukraine started banning books in 2016 that a special committee (State Committee for State TV and Radio Broadcasting's licensing and distribution-control department) had determined to contain anti-Ukrainian content.

In January 2018, the Russian version of British historian Antony Beevor's Stalingrad was added to this list. The head of the committee, Serhiy Oliyinyk, told Radio Free Europe that one particular reason was that Beevor had included information about Ukrainian militia killing 90 Jewish children on orders of the SS "to save the feelings of the Sonderkommando." He claimed this had never been confirmed at post-war trials and was taken from Soviet sources. Beevor strongly criticized the ban and said the source was actually German resistance fighter Helmuth Groscurth. "It's utterly outrageous. They have no reason for doing it. It's quite clear both in the Russian edition and English edition what the source was and where it came from – this rather brave and religious officer [Groscurth] who protested strongly, despite threats he would be reported to Himmler ... about this massacre of the children. There's no way the Soviets would even have known about it." It was also strongly criticized by the Ukraine-based Human Rights in Ukraine.

Internet censorship and surveillance 
In December 2010 the OpenNet Initiative found little or no evidence of Internet filtering in all four areas (political, social, conflict/security, and Internet tools) for which they test.

In its Freedom on the Net report covering the period May 2012 through April 2013, Freedom House found the Internet in Ukraine to be "largely unhindered" and rated the Internet in Ukraine as "Free" with an overall score of 28 on a scale from 0 (most free) to 100 (least free). The report said that "there is no practice of institutionalized blocking or filtering, or a regulatory framework for censorship of content online", but "there have been attempts at creating legislation which could censor or limit content" and would "present indirect threats to freedom of information online."

As of 2012, access to Internet content in Ukraine was largely unfettered. Ukraine possessed relatively liberal legislation governing the Internet and access to information. While there were no government restrictions on access to the Internet, law enforcement bodies were known to monitor the Internet, at times without appropriate legal authority. There have been occasional agitations of interference by law enforcement agencies with prominent bloggers and online publications.

In 2014 it was reported that the Security Service of Ukraine (SBU) asked the Ukrainian Internet Association (UIA) to block a list of websites accused of "promote war, ethnic hatred, and violent change in the constitutional order or territorial integrity of Ukraine." Such orders should, however, come from courts of law and not security agencies.

On 16 May 2017, President Poroshenko signed a decree requiring providers to block access to a number of Russian websites including four of the most popular websites in Ukraine: VKontakte, Odnoklassniki, Yandex and Mail.Ru. The president claimed they participated in an information war against Ukraine.

Situation in the Russian-annexed Crimea 

The media environment in Crimea was completely transformed by the March 2014 Russian annexation of the peninsula, after the ejection of Viktor Yanukovych from power in Ukraine following the euromaidan protests. Russian authorities engineered an annexation referendum to Russia, and restrictive Russian media laws started to be enacted in the Black Sea peninsula too. Media conditions in Crimea in 2014 were worse than in Russia itself, due to the effort of Russia-imposed authorities to rein in a previously relatively pluralistic media landscape. Media outlets were shut down, broadcasts of Ukrainian channels were suspended, and journalists fled the region due to fears of harassment, violence, and arrests. The situation of press freedom in Crimea in 2014 was identified by Freedom House as the worst in the European continent.

Russian outlets, particularly state-owned ones, enjoy a dominant position in post-annexation Crimea. The distribution of Ukrainian print media has been obstructed by Russian officials, and even the Ukrainian Postal Agency had to stop deliveries in the peninsula. Widespread and irregular expropriations by Russian authorities have also affected the Crimean media landscape

Free access to the internet in Crimea was threatened by Russian authorities. Rostelecom laid a cable under the Kerch strait and provided online services in the peninsula starting from July 2014. Since August 2014, mobile phone services by Ukrainian carriers were disrupted and replaced by Russian companies.

Legal framework 
After the annexation, Russian authorities passed a local constitution on the Russian model and started imposing Russian legislation. Despite guarantees for freedom of speech and freedom of the press in the Russian legislation, politicised judiciary and restrictive laws devoid them of actual contents, leaving broad discretion to federal regulators in media registration and licensing.

All media in Crimea, including online ones, were afforded until January 2015 to register with the Russian federal media regulator Rozkomnadzor and get a license. Officials warned editors that registration would be denied to media that spread "extremist" contents. A December 2013 Russian law against separatism (carrying sanctions of up to 5 years in prison) was used to repress criticism of the annexation and calls for a return of the territory to Ukraine.

NGOs, journalists' associations and citizen groups in Crimea became subject to restrictive Russian laws, including measures limiting foreign funding.
Russian authorities failed to protect journalists, activists and citizens from abuses by paramilitaries and security forces. Cases of unlawful detentions and physical assaults were reported throughout 2014 in Crimea.

Attacks and threats against journalists 

Since the annexation, Russian authorities threatened and harassed pro-Ukrainian or simply independent media in Crimea. Media professionals - including foreign ones - have been obstructed, detained, questioned, and have had their equipment seized or destroyed. "Self-defence" paramilitary units have enjoyed impunity for their punitive actions against non-aligned journalists.
 In June 2014 paramilitaries stopped Sergey Mokrushin and Vladen Melnikov (of the Centre for Investigative Journalism) on the streets of Simferopol for singing an anti-Putin song. The two were detained and badly beaten, then passed to the police, who released them.
 Ruslan Yugosh, among the founders of the Sobytiya Kryma (Crimean Events) news website, was summoned by the police in June 2014. In his absence from Crimea, the police interrogated his 73-years-old mother, threatening her with repercussions related to Yugosh' work.

Several human rights and civic activists chose to relocate to mainland Ukraine to escape restrictions, intimidation and harassment, providing information to the Crimean public via the internet.
The independent TV and radio station Chornomorska moved to the mainland after being forced off-air in March 2014 and having its equipment seized under the pretext of failure to pay fees.
The anti-annexation blogger Yelizaveta Bohutskaya left Crimea in September 2014 after a police raid at her home. She had been questioned for six hours and had had her equipment seized.
 Radio Free Europe/Radio Liberty created a Crimean news service in Russian, Ukrainian and Tatar languages.

Repression of Crimean Tatar media 
Crimean Tatar media were particularly targeted by Russian repression.  ATR, Avdet and the QHA news agency remained among the last independent media operating in Crimea by the end of 2014.
 In June 2014 Shevket Kaybullayev, editor of the Avdet newspaper, was questioned and warned by the prosecutor over "extremist contents" due to the paper's coverage of an opposition activities and the use of the term "occupation". In September 2014 the premises of the Avdet newspaper were raided and searched by unidentified security forces, without a warrant. The newspaper was closed down and its bank accounts seized. Kaybullayev was officially warned that he would be prosecuted and risked up to 5 years in jail if Avdet had continued reporting on calls for a boycott of the 2014 Crimean legislative election.
 The Crimean Tatar TV channel ATR received a warning in May 2015 after covering a Tatar protest. It was subject to an inspection in September 2014 by the Interior Ministry, as suspect of inciting "extremism" and "distrust towards the authorities". KGB agents regularly called the station and applied pressures, threatening it with closure.

Situation in the occupied regions of Donetsk and Luhansk 

Seven journalists and media workers were killed in Ukraine in 2014. One of them, Vyacheslav Veremiy of Vesti, was shot in Kyiv in February 2014. The others died in the conflict areas in the east. (According to the Prosecutor General of Ukraine's Office, Veremiy's murderer was Jalal Aliyev. Who, according to unofficial information, was killed in Horlivka in July 2015 fighting for the Donetsk People's Republic.)

In Donetsk and Luhansk, Russian-backed separatists seized control of broadcasting infrastructure, replacing Ukrainian channels with Russian pro-Kremlin channels in both on-air and cable transmissions.

In July 2014, pro-Russian separatists in Donetsk tried to deter journalists from covering the downing of the MH17 airliner by threatening them with arbitrary detention and intimidation.

Transparency of media ownership

Transparency of media ownership refers to the public availability of accurate, comprehensive and up-to-date information about media ownership structures. A legal regime guaranteeing transparency of media ownership makes possible for the public as well as for media authorities to find out who effectively owns, controls and influences the media as well as media influence on political parties or state bodies.

The lack of transparency on media ownership has typically been a negative trait of the Ukrainian media system. In 2005 Ukraine committed itself to the Council of Europe to introduce a law for ensuring transparency of media ownership, according to the Resolution 1466 (2005)1 of the Parliamentary Assembly of the Council of Europe.

In 2014, the European Commission's progress report on the implementation of the European Neighbourhood Policy in Ukraine found the lack of transparency as an issue in the country and that proper legislative framework should be adopted. To comply with its international commitment, legislation on transparency of media ownership has been reformed in 2015. On 10 September 2015, President Petro Poroshenko signed the law called "On Amendments to Several Laws of Ukraine on Ensuring the Transparency of Media Ownership and Implementing the Principles of state Policy in the Sphere of Television and Radio Broadcasting". The law entered into force on 1 October 2015.

The new legal system regulating transparency of media ownership, which establishes a detailed system for guaranteeing transparency, has been appraised for its level of innovation by many international organisations and experts but still the effectiveness of its implementation remains to be seen. In general terms, the new regulation obliges broadcasts and program service providers to make public detailed information about their ownership structures and final beneficiaries. These requirements apply to the audiovisual sector (TV and radio), print and information agencies but not to online publications. Also, the amendments prevent businesses and individuals registered offshore from establishing and owning broadcast companies and program service providers in Ukraine. Moreover, the new law sets forth new financial disclosure rules for owners.

Specifically, the new law amends article 12 of the existing Law of Ukraine on Television and Radio Broadcasting of 1994, establishing that national and local government authorities, individuals and legal entities which are registered offline, political parties, religious organisations, professional unions, and persons that were convicted by courts and that are still serving their sentences cannot be owners of a TV or radio stations in Ukraine. Furthermore, the Law prohibits to physical or legal persons residing in a country which is recognised as an aggressor or occupier the right to own a television or a radio station in Ukraine. This sentence refers to the Russian Federation which annexed Crimea in 2014. The Law provides a new definition of ownership which is closely connected to the exercise of a decisive influence in the management or business activity of the media outlet directly or through other persons and includes also final beneficiaries. The Law requires that information on the ownership structure and on the individuals owning at least 10% or more of a television or radio broadcasting have to be made public on the company's website and sent to the National Council for Questions of Television and Radio Broadcasting, which is the national media regulator in Ukraine. According to the law, the council can impose fines when information provided are insufficient or incorrect.

According to some experts, one of the main weakness of the new law is that it does not exclude funding from financial sources located in Cyprus (even if it prohibits the transfer of funds from offshore territories), through which ownership of most Ukrainian TV channels is exercised. Among some commentators there are some doubts that the Law will be amended to address this issue, due to the strong lobbying efforts of TV owners. Other doubts have been voiced due to the lack of an effective sanctions system.

In 2016, Reporters Without Borders, together with the Institute of Mass Information (Kyiv), launched the project Media Ownership Monitor Ukraine to promote transparency in media ownership and to map who owns and controls the media in Ukraine, by creating a public available and updated database listing the owners of the main media outlets, and detailing also the interests and the affilitations of owners into companies or political parties.

See also

 Human rights in Ukraine
 Internet censorship and surveillance in Ukraine
 List of newspapers in Ukraine
 Media of Ukraine
 Telecommunications in Ukraine
 Television in Ukraine

Notes

References

External links 
 , 6 July 2014.

Ukraine
Mass media in Ukraine
Human rights in Ukraine
Ukraine